The Agglomération du Choletais, also simply known as CAC, is the intercommunal structure gathering the city of Cholet and its suburbs.

It is located in the Maine-et-Loire département, in the Pays de la Loire région (France). It was formed on 1 January 2017 by the merger of the former Communauté d'agglomération du Choletais, the Communauté de communes du Bocage and the Communauté de communes du Vihiersois-Haut-Layon. Its area is 788.0 km2. Its population was 104,382 in 2018, of which 54,186 in Cholet proper.

Composition
The Agglomération du Choletais gathers the following 26 communes:

Bégrolles-en-Mauges
Cernusson
Les Cerqueux
Chanteloup-les-Bois
Cholet
Cléré-sur-Layon
Coron
Lys-Haut-Layon
Maulévrier
Le May-sur-Èvre
Mazières-en-Mauges
Montilliers
Nuaillé
Passavant-sur-Layon
La Plaine
La Romagne
Saint-Christophe-du-Bois
Saint-Léger-sous-Cholet
Saint-Paul-du-Bois
La Séguinière
Somloire
La Tessoualle
Toutlemonde
Trémentines
Vezins
Yzernay

References

Choletais
Choletais
States and territories established in 2017
Cholet